Scythris pruinata is a moth of the family Scythrididae. It was described by Mark I. Falkovitsh in 1972. It is found in Iran and Uzbekistan.

References

pruinata
Moths described in 1972
Moths of Asia